The 2017–18 Skeleton World Cup was a multi-race series over a season for Skeleton. The season started on 9 November 2017 in Lake Placid, USA, and concluded on 19 January 2018 in Königssee, Germany. The World Cup is organised by the IBSF (formerly the FIBT), who also run World Cups and Championships in bobsleigh. The season was mainly sponsored by BMW.

Calendar

Results

Men

Women

Standings

Men

Women

Medal table

References

External links 
 IBSF

Skeleton World Cup
2017 in skeleton
2018 in skeleton